is a Japanese politician from the Liberal Democratic Party. He has represented Tokyo 10th district in the House of Representatives since 2017.

References 

Living people
1977 births
Liberal Democratic Party (Japan) politicians

21st-century Japanese politicians
Members of the House of Representatives from Tokyo